The Ski Bum is a novel by Lithuanian-French author Romain Gary (1914–1980). French translation was published in 1969 under the title 'Adieu Gary Cooper'. The novel tells the story of Lenni, a 21-year-old boy escaping from America, his country of birth, to pursue his dreams in the Alpine mountains of Switzerland. The story is about how he faces his obstacles with his logic.

A film adaptation was released in 1971, starring Zalman King and Charlotte Rampling.

References

1965 French novels
English-language novels
French novels adapted into films
Novels by Romain Gary
Novels set in Switzerland
Harper & Row books